Roberto Sawyers Furtado (born 17 October 1986) is a Costa Rican athlete competing primarily in the hammer throw and occasionally in the shot put and discus throw. He has won multiple medals on regional level. In addition, he competed at three consecutive Pan American Games.

His personal best in the event is 77.15 metres set in Liberec in 2016. This is the current national record.

Competition record

References

1986 births
Living people
Costa Rican hammer throwers
Male hammer throwers
Athletes (track and field) at the 2007 Pan American Games
Athletes (track and field) at the 2011 Pan American Games
Athletes (track and field) at the 2015 Pan American Games
Athletes (track and field) at the 2019 Pan American Games
Pan American Games competitors for Costa Rica
Costa Rican male athletes
World Athletics Championships athletes for Costa Rica
Athletes (track and field) at the 2016 Summer Olympics
Olympic athletes of Costa Rica
Central American Games silver medalists for Costa Rica
Central American Games medalists in athletics
Central American and Caribbean Games bronze medalists for Costa Rica
Competitors at the 2010 Central American and Caribbean Games
Competitors at the 2014 Central American and Caribbean Games
Competitors at the 2018 Central American and Caribbean Games
Central American and Caribbean Games medalists in athletics